The Dudek Twix is a Polish two-place, paraglider that was designed and produced by Dudek Paragliders of Bydgoszcz. It is now out of production.

Design and development
The Twix, indicating "two", was designed as a tandem "bi-place" or two seater glider for flight training. It is made from Skytex material with Technora lines.

Operational history
Reviewer Noel Bertrand described the Twix in a 2003 review as "technically very elaborate".

Specifications (Twix)

References

Twix
Paragliders